Momodora: Reverie Under the Moonlight is an indie Metroidvania video game developed by Brazilian studio Bombservice and published by Playism. The game was originally released on March 4, 2016 for Microsoft Windows. It is the fourth installment of the Momodora series that began in 2010 with Momodora I.

Gameplay
Momodora: Reverie Under the Moonlight is a side-scroller platformer.  The player controls Kaho, a priestess on a quest to stop a curse that has been corrupting the land.  Kaho explores a variety of areas collecting items, avoiding obstacles, and fighting monsters.  In every area Kaho must also fight a boss.  In combat Kaho can perform both melee attacks with a leaf and ranged attacks with a bow.  Kaho can also find and equip items and spells to assist her in combat.

Plot
Momodora: Reverie Under the Moonlight is a prequel set 400 years before the events of Momodora I.  The story follows a Priestess named Kaho, who travels to the eastern Kingdom of Karst to stop a curse that has been spreading across the land and affecting her village. In Karst City Kaho meets Cath, a Knightess who informs Kaho that the queen of Karst is the source of the curse, and the only way to stop the curse is to kill the queen.  Kaho travels around collecting the four pieces of a crest required to open Karst Castle and face the queen.  Inside Karst Castle, Kaho is briefly reunited with a dying Cath who failed to stop the queen. Kaho confronts the queen and manages to defeat her. Kaho then sacrifices herself, drawing the curse into her body in order to seal it and save the land.

Development
Momodora: Reverie Under the Moonlight was developed in GameMaker: Studio. , the developer of the Momodora series funds the development of their games through the crowdfunding platform Patreon.

PlayStation 4 and Xbox One ports of the game were released on March 16, 2017, and March 17, 2017 respectively. A Nintendo Switch version was released on January 10, 2019 by Dangen Entertainment.

Reception

Momodora: Reverie Under the Moonlight received an 82/100 aggregate review score on Metacritic,  indicating "generally favorable reviews". Chris Shive from Hardcore Gamer gave the game a 4 out of 5 score saying, "Momodora: Reverie Under the Moonlight is the ideal mix of old and new. The visuals and 2D platforming scream '80s NES, but the detail that went into the pixel art and the attack combos mixed with fluid animation give this title just enough of a modern feel so it doesn’t feel dated." Destructoid Nick Valdez rated the game 8 out of 10, praising its "tight, intense combat," but commented that the game's soundtrack was "unmemorable, and not functional at all times."

References

External links
 

2016 video games
Action-adventure games
Indie video games
Metroidvania games
Platform games
PlayStation 4 games
Retro-style video games
Side-scrolling video games
Single-player video games
Video games developed in Brazil
Video games featuring female protagonists
Video games set in castles
Windows games
Xbox One games
Gothic video games
Playism games